Thirteen referendums were held in Switzerland during 1994. The first five were held on 20 February on federal resolutions on roadbuilding, continuing existing truck tolls and varying tolls based on engine power or mileage, as well as a popular initiative "for the protection of the alpine region from through traffic" and an amendment to the aeronautical law. All five were approved by voters. The second set of referendums was held on 12 June on federal resolutions on an article on the Swiss Federal Constitution on the promotion of culture and a review of the procedure for naturalising young immigrants, as  well as a federal law on Swiss troops in peacekeeping operations. Whilst the resolutions were both approved by a majority of voters, they did not receive the approval from the majority of cantons, so were rejected, as was the law on troops.

The next two referendums were held on 25 September on abolishing price reductions on breadstuffs and an amendment to the Strafgesetzbuch and the military penal code, both of which were approved. The final three referendums were held on 4 December on federal laws on health insurance and foreigners, and a popular initiative "for a healthy health insurance". The two laws were approved and the initiative rejected.

Results

References

1994 elections in Switzerland
1994 referendums
Referendums in Switzerland